Marina Evelyn Vello Ribatski (born December 10, 1984), also known as Marina Gasolina, Marina Ribatski and MC Marina Vello, is a Brazilian singer and the former MC/Singer/Songwriter for Brazilian Funk Carioca  band Bonde do Rolê. She decided to leave the band in December 2007 due to problems within the band. Her musical influences include Hole. She was formerly a literature student at the Federal University of Paraná.

Life and career

After playing in several punk bands during her teenage years, Marina founded and fronted Domino signed, Brazilian baile funk band Bonde Do Role. After touring the world for two years straight, they released their debut album ‘With Lasers’ which was produced by Diplo, DJ Chernobyl and Radioclit. Marina then left the band to focus on her solo career and broaden her horizons.

She moved to London in 2008 and has spent the time recording tracks for international acts such as Crookers, Herve, Maskinen, Severin, The Go! Team, AcidKids and Architecture in Helsinki. This led to her building her own, new sound and writing songs with Berlin-based Electronicat and the Brazilian one man band O Lendario Chucrobillyman.

She is featured in the Maskinen song and music video Dansa med vapen, released in October 2009.

In 2010, Marina founded her own label Anfetamina Records and released her first solo single Leone, produced by Etienne Tron (aka Radioclit) and Electronicat.

In 2011, she collaborated with Secousse to record a version of "Freak le Boom Boom" for the Red Hot Organization's most recent charitable album "Red Hot+Rio 2." The album is a follow-up to the 1996 "Red Hot + Rio." Proceeds from the sales will be donated to raise awareness and money to fight AIDS/HIV and related health and social issues.

Marina is currently working on her debut album now with producer Daniel Hunt from Ladytron.

References

 

1984 births
Living people
Brazilian people of Polish descent
People from Curitiba
Federal University of Paraná alumni
21st-century Brazilian singers
21st-century Brazilian women singers